The Out of the Game Tour is a concert tour by singer-songwriter Rufus Wainwright. The tour supports his seventh studio album, Out of the Game. Beginning in April 2012, the tour has played over 100 shows in the Americas, Asia, Europe and Australasia.

Background
The tour was announced on Wainwright's official website, coinciding with the singer's album release. Behind the scenes, Wainwright married his long-term partner Jörn Weisbrodt while the singer had a break in his tour schedule. Wainwright explained his personal life would not only reflect in the album but also the tour. The singer continued to say that he would be touring less in the forthcoming years, while concentrating on being a parent.

The tour began with two rehearsal shows at Under the Bridge, a nightclub located within Stamford Bridge in London. The tour officially kicked off in Denmark. Some of the tour dates in Europe included festival appearances at the Montreux Jazz Festival, Melt! festival and the North Sea Jazz Festival.

Opening acts
Teddy Thompson (Europe—select dates) (New York City, Los Angeles, Melbourne— September 16)
Krystle Warren (Europe—select dates) (Oakland, San Diego, Melbourne—September 15)
Adam Cohen (North America—select dates)
Megan Washington (Australia)
Ingrid Michaelson (Vienna, Boston, Nashville)
Lucy Wainwright Roche (Nashville)

Setlist
{{hidden
| headercss = background: #ccccff; font-size: 100%; width: 65%;
| contentcss = text-align: left; font-size: 100%; width: 75%;
| header = North America
| content =May 9, 2012 – New York City, NY – Howard Gilman Opera House
"Candles"
"Rashida"
"Barbara"
"Welcome to the Ball"
"Song of You"
"Greek Song"
"April Fools"
"The One You Love"
"Saratoga Summer Song" (performed by Teddy Thompson)
"I Don't Know" (performed by Krystle Warren)
"Respectable Dive"
"Out of the Game"
"Jericho"
"Sometimes You Need"
"Perfect Man"
"One Man Guy" (performed with Charysse Blackman and Teddy Thompson)
"Going to a Town"
"Montauk"
"14th Street"
"The Art Teacher"
"Tell My Sister" (performed by Martha Wainwright)
"Bitter Tears"
Encore
"Poses"

August 8, 2012 – Chicago, IL – The Vic Theatre
"Candles"
"Rashida"
"Barbara"
"April Fools"
"Song of You"
"The One You Love"
"Saratoga Summer Song" (performed by Teddy Thompson)
"I Don't Know" (performed by Krystle Warren)
"Respectable Dive"
"Out of the Game"
"Jericho"
"Perfect Man"
"The Man that Got Away"
"One Man Guy" (performed with Charysse Blackman and Teddy Thompson)
"The Art Teacher"
"Going to a Town"
"Montauk"
"14th Street"
"Bitter Tears"
Encore
"Grey Gardens"
"Chelsea Hotel #2" (performed with Adam Cohen)
"Cigarettes and Chocolate Milk"
"Poses"

April 13, 2013 – Saint Paul, MN – Fitzgerald Theater
"The Art Teacher"
"The Maker Makes"
"Vibrate"
"Out of the Game"
"Jericho"
"Who Are You New York?"
"Memphis Skyline"
"Hallelujah"
Intermission
"Going to a Town"
"Montauk"
"Zebulon"
"Cigarettes and Chocolate Milk"
Encore
"Millbrook"
"Walking Song"
"Complainte de la Butte"
"Foolish Love"
}}

Tour dates

Festivals and other miscellaneous performances

Cancellations and rescheduled shows

Box office score data

Critical reception
The tour was met with mixed reviews from music critics. For the first North American concert in New York City, Jon Pareles (The New York Times), felt the concert was a nice blend of Wainwright current and past songs. He continues to say "At times there was friction between Mr. Wainwright's long melody lines and the shuffle and strut of their settings. But his supposed turn to pop isn’t a drastic change; older songs like 'April Fools' and 'Greek Song' showed he has been in that territory before".

The show was also praised by Simon Vozick-Levinson (Rolling Stone). He says "But for the most part, this was a night of pure pop joy. Afterward, he took a deep bow, accepted a bouquet from someone in the front rows—his second of the night—and walked offstage with a delighted grin". For the concert at the Ronit Farm Amphitheater, Rachel Marder (The Jerusalem Post) felt Wainwright channelled Elton John. She writes, "The show felt like a true ensemble performance, with the saxophone-player, clarinetist, drummer and backup singers all taking solos".

In Louisville, Selna Frye (louisville.com) thinks the singer gave a stellar night of song. She comments, "As entertaining and musically rich as this show was, one primary thing I came away with—and maybe others did too—was an appreciation of Wainwright's unselfishness in giving these other fine artists their moments in the spotlight". At the Chicago show, Megan Ritt (Consequence of Sound), stated Wainwright was a "consummate performer". She goes on to say "The rarities he played certainly will stick with long-time fans, but the most impressive feature of the show was how the sometimes somber Wainwright appeared to enjoy the experience as much as the audience". At the Pabst Theatre in Milwaukee, Piet Levy stated, "His gorgeous operatic croon, heard alone, essentially served as the light".

The concert at the famed Sydney Opera House received a less favorable review. Iain Shedden (The Australian) writes that following a magnificent show, Wainwright ended it like a "high school end-of-term pantomime". He further explains, "The 90 minutes was a near-perfect blend of pop smarts and raw emotion, of which the singer seems to have an unlimited supply. The encore, however, was a horror of such significance, it threatened to undo everything that came before". At the Vicar Street in Dubin, Lauren Murphy (The Irish Times) gave the show three out of five stars. She writes, "Roving the aisles singing 'Gay Messiah', his intention to entertain is acknowledged—but another two or three songs in place of the pantomime-style silliness would have been more heartily appreciated. It's an unfortunate end to an otherwise stirring show".

Band
Keyboard: Andy Burton
Guitar: Sharief Hobley and Teddy Thompson
Bass guitar: Brad Albetta
Drums: Ben Perowsky
Horns: Tim Ries
Supporting vocals: Charysse Blackman and Krystle Warren
Source:

References

2012 concert tours
2013 concert tours
Rufus Wainwright